Paweł Piotr Kukiz (born 24 June 1963) is a Polish politician, singer and actor. He is the leader of Kukiz'15, a non-partisan political alliance campaigning for single-member districts, and was a candidate in the 2015 presidential election, in which he received 21% of the votes in the first round of the elections, finishing third. Since 2015 Kukiz is a member of Polish parliament. He was a co-leader of the Polish Coalition, until Kukiz'15 left in late 2020.

Biography 
Grandson of Marian Kukiz, leader of the State Police of the Second Polish Republic. Son of Marianne and Thaddeus (doctor and activist). Since 1991 he has been married to Malgozhata. He has three daughters: Yulia (born in 1991), Paula (born in 1994) and Anna (born in 2000).

A musician by profession, he received a general secondary education. In Niemodlin, he graduated from primary school and general secondary school in 1981. A few years later, in 1984, in Niemodlin, Pavel Kukiz formed the band "Piersi" together with Rafal Eżyrski, Zbyszek Mozdzerski and Orin. He studied administration at the University of Wrocław and then law and political science at the University of Warsaw, but did not graduate from any of these universities.

In the 1980s, he was the founder and vocalist of various rock bands such as CDN, Hak and Aya RL. From 1984 to 2013, he was the leader of the Piersi team. Pavel Kukiz has released nine albums with this band.

From 1989 to 1993 Pavel Kukiz performed as the vocalist of the group "Emigranci". In 1995, Pavel Kukiz starred in the sensational film "Girl's Guide" by Juliusz Mahulski. In 1998, together with the Polish rapper and actor Bolek, Pavel Kukiz starred in the films "Monday" (1998) and "Tuesday" (2001) directed by Witold Adamek. In the second half of the 90's Pavel Kukiz appeared in an advertisement for "Pepsi".

In 2001 he participated in the music project "Yugoton", and in 2007 in its continuation — "Yugopolis". In 2003 the first and only album of the duo "Borysewicz & Kukiz" was released, where Pavel Kukiz sang accompanied by guitarist Jan Borysevich with the participation of session musicians.

In the 2005 presidential election in Poland, Pavel Kukiz participates in the honorary committee in support of Donald Tusk's candidacy. In 2006-2007, he also supported Hanna Gronkiewicz-Waltz's local government campaign and Civic Platform parliamentary party. In 2009, Pavel Kukiz became the editor-in-chief of the nieobecni.com.pl portal.

In 2010, together with Maciej Malenchuk, he recorded a CD with the repertoire of the "Kabaret Starszych Panów" — "Starsi panowie". In a duet with Polish rapper Pih, he sang the song "Młodość" on the album "Bal matural" (2014). The producers of the album were Robert Menchynsky and Jan Borysevych.

Discography

Studio albums

Collaborative albums

Filmography
 ...jestem przeciw (1985) as a Boy
 Girl guide (1995) as Józef Galica
 Billboard (1998) as Żyła
 Matki, żony i kochanki II (1998)
 Poniedziałek (1998) as Dawid
 Stacja PRL (1999-2000)
 Dzieci Jarocina (2000) as himself
 Wtorek (2001) as Dawid
 Czwarta władza (2004) as Actor Paweł Szeląg
 S@motność w Sieci (2006)  as Priest Andrzej

References

1963 births
Living people
People from Nysa County
Polish rock singers
Polish Roman Catholics
Polish pop singers
Polish lyricists
Polish keyboardists
Polish record producers
Polish film actors
Kukiz'15 politicians
Candidates in the 2015 Polish presidential election
21st-century Polish male singers
21st-century Polish singers
Members of the Polish Sejm 2015–2019
Members of the Polish Sejm 2019–2023